"In My Blood" is a song recorded by Canadian singer Shawn Mendes. Written by Geoff Warburton, Scott Harris and its producers Mendes and Teddy Geiger, it was released by Island Records on March 22, 2018, as the lead single from Mendes' self-titled third studio album. It was nominated for Song of the Year at the 61st Annual Grammy Awards, and won Single of the Year at the Juno Awards of 2019. "In My Blood" also won Choice pop song at the Teen Choice Awards.

Background
"In My Blood" chronicles Mendes' struggle with anxiety. It marks the first time the singer has publicly discussed his experiences with mental health issues.

Release and promotion
On March 16, 2018, Mendes posted a collage on social media consisting of two uncaptioned images of blank color blocks after he wrote the song. In 2013, he was writing before his first talk show appearance. In 2014, on The Ellen DeGeneres Show, one in beige and one in coral. He later changed his profile picture to a beige background color with a floral design, as featured in the single's artwork.

On March 19, Mendes partnered with Spotify to promote the single on a billboard in New York's Times Square that reads "Shawn Mendes coming soon". Shortly after, he posted a video that includes two dates: March 22 and March 23. The dates were also projected in various places in London.

He officially announced the song on March 20, along with its release date and the single's artwork. "This song," he wrote in a social media post, "is the closest song to my heart that I've ever written". A Portuguese version was also released on June 3, 2018, in support of Portugal at the 2018 FIFA World Cup in Russia, owing to Mendes' Portuguese heritage.

Composition
"In My Blood" is a rock and pop rock ballad, whose acoustic opening was described as "soft and despairing". As the song progresses, "an insistent drum comes in" before Mendes' voice rises on the chorus. A Rolling Stone contributor noted that the chorus features "shuddering drums" and "throbbing electric guitars", with "choral backing vocals" that "add soothing textures to the final hook". Mendes's vocals spare from A2 to C5 in this song.

Critical reception
Jon Caramanica from The New York Times opined it as a standout in comparison to Mendes' previous singles, referring to how "scarred and forlorn" he sounds while commending his songwriting ability. Hugh McIntyre of Forbes.com noted that the song is an evolution of Mendes' well-known sound, beginning with "a familiar acoustic guitar". He wrote that Mendes has adopted "a more mature Kings of Leon-type sound", calling the song "a job well done".

Mike Nied of Idolator opined that "the sweeping anthem offers an intimate glimpse into his deepest thoughts", with a radio-friendly pop rock instrumental, adding that the song "sounds like another sure-fire smash". He concluded by calling it "a moving and inspiring track and a wonderful taste of things to come". Gil Kaufman of Billboard deemed the song "one of Mendes' most mature efforts to date". In another Billboard article, Abby Jones listed it as his best single to date. Fuse's Jeff Benjamin praised the song's mature themes and deemed it an "arena-rock anthem."

Chart performance
It debuted at number 72 on the US Billboard Hot 100 after only one day of sales and streaming tracking and four days of airplay tracking. It later rose to number 11. Mendes became the first artist to have four number-one songs on the Billboard Adult Top 40 radio airplay chart before turning 20 years old, with "In My Blood" being his fourth.

In Canada, the single debuted at 62 also after one day of tracking. The following week, it rose 53 spots to a new peak of 9, making it Mendes' fifth top 10 in his home country. It went number one in Hungary and reached the top 10 of several European and Asian countries.

In the United Kingdom, "In My Blood" debuted at Number 13 after one week of sales and fluctuated up and down the Top 20 before ultimately reaching its peak at 10 at the end of May. The song spent 13 weeks in the UK Top 40 and was Mendes' fifth top ten hit in the region.

Music video
The music video for the song was uploaded on April 24, 2018. Directed by Jay Martin, the video features Shawn Mendes lying on the floor barefoot, while his surroundings begin to change. As he sings, it begins to snow and rain. The video ends with a wide shot of Mendes surrounded by a garden of flowers.

Live performances
On March 28, 2018, Mendes made a live performance debut of the song on The Late Late Show with James Corden. On April 12, Mendes performed the song live during the German Echo Music Prize. Mendes performed the song several times in the UK, including at the BBC Radio Live Lounge on April 19, on Sounds Like Friday Night on April 20, and at Queen Elizabeth II's 92nd birthday concert at the Royal Albert Hall in London on April 21. On April 24, Mendes performed the song at the TIME 100 Gala.

Mendes's performance of the song on The Ellen DeGeneres Show aired on May 17, and he performed the song at the 2018 Billboard Music Awards on May 20. He performed the song on The One Show on May 28, and as part of his set at BBC Music's Biggest Weekend in Swansea on May 27. Mendes also performed the song as part of his sets on Today and at the Governors Ball Music Festival, both on June 1 in New York City, and at Wango Tango the next day in Los Angeles. He performed the song at the 2018 MTV Video Music Awards held in New York on August 20. In February 2019, he performed the song with Miley Cyrus at the 61st Annual Grammy Awards. In May 2019, he performed the song on Saturday Night Live.

Track listing
Digital download
 "In My Blood" – 3:31

Digital download – acoustic
 "In My Blood" (acoustic) – 3:32

Digital download – Portuguese version
 "In My Blood" (Portuguese version) – 3:32

Credits and personnel
Credits adapted from Tidal.
 Shawn Mendes – composition, production, vocals, guitar
 Geoff Warburton – composition, guitar
 Teddy Geiger – composition, production, keyboard, background vocals, bass, drums, guitar, piano, programming
 Scott Harris – composition, guitar
 Harry Burr – mixing assistance
 Andrew Maury – mixing
 Joe LaPorta – mastering

Charts

Weekly charts

Year-end charts

Certifications

Release history

References

2018 songs
2018 singles
2010s ballads
Shawn Mendes songs
Island Records singles
Republic Records singles
Songs about diseases and disorders
Songs written by Shawn Mendes
Songs written by Scott Harris (songwriter)
Songs written by Teddy Geiger
Rock ballads
Pop ballads
Songs written by Geoff Warburton
Number-one singles in Hungary
Juno Award for Single of the Year singles